Araucaria heterophylla (synonym A. excelsa) is a species of conifer. As its vernacular name Norfolk Island pine (or Norfolk pine) implies, the tree is endemic to Norfolk Island, an external territory of Australia located in the Pacific Ocean between New Zealand and New Caledonia. It is not a true pine, which belong to the genus Pinus in the family Pinaceae, but instead is a member of the genus Araucaria, in the family Araucariaceae, which also contains the monkey-puzzle tree. Members of Araucaria occur across the South Pacific, especially concentrated in New Caledonia (about  due north of Norfolk Island) where 13 closely related and similar-appearing species are found. It is sometimes called a star pine, Polynesian pine, triangle tree or living Christmas tree, due to its symmetrical shape as a sapling.

History
The first European known to have sighted Norfolk Island was Captain James Cook.  In 1774, on his second voyage to the South Pacific in HMS Resolution, Cook noted the presence of large forests of tall, straight trees that appeared to be suitable for use as masts and yards for sailing ships.  However, when the island was occupied in 1788 by convicts transported from Britain, it was found that Norfolk Island pine trees were not resilient enough for such use and the idea was abandoned.

In the late 1950s, a trial shipment of Norfolk pine logs was sent to plywood manufacturers in Sydney, New South Wales, with the hope of developing a timber export industry on Norfolk Island.  Although the plywood companies reported excellent results, the industry was deemed not sustainable by the Norfolk Island Advisory Council, which decided to reserve timber production for local use. The timber is good for woodturning and, together with the similar Cook pine, is extensively used by Hawaii artisans.

Description

From the straight trunk, it emits its branches almost horizontal or slightly oblique, in number of five, forming floors; the plane of each floor is a perfect pentagon. If kept indoors, the tree remains smaller. The gray-brown bark falls off in fine scales. At the more or less horizontal to sometimes hanging branches, the branches are four to seven in regular whorls.

The thickest, scale-like leaves on coning branches are in the upper crown. They disintegrate at maturity to release the nut-like edible seeds. There are four cotyledons present. It is a dioecious tree (male and female flowers in different plants), although it can also be monoecious.

The scientific name heterophylla ("different leaves") derives from the variation in the leaves between young and adult plants.

Cultivation

The distinctive appearance of this tree, with its widely spaced branches and symmetrical, triangular outline, has made it a popular cultivated species, either as a single tree or in avenues. When the tree reaches maturity, the shape may become less symmetrical. Despite the endemic implication of the species name Norfolk Island pine, the species is widely  planted as an ornamental tree for its exotic, pleasing appearance and fairly broad climatic adaptability, and now occurs throughout the world in regions with suitable Mediterranean and humid subtropical climate. It grows well in deep sand, as long as it receives reliable water when young. This, and its tolerance of salt and wind, make it ideal for coastal situations. Indoors, the plant needs a bright location with at least 40% but preferably above 60% humidity for good growth. Indoor trees must not be exposed to the scorching sun or dry air from a radiator; the temperature should ideally not exceed .

Many of the "Norfolk Island pines" that grow in Hawaii, including their descendants used as potted ornamentals on the U.S. mainland, are actually the closely related Cook pines, the two species having been confused when introduced.

Uses
Young trees are often grown as houseplants in areas where the winters are too cold for them to grow outside (they will not, for example, survive outdoors in most of North America or Europe), and are sometimes used as Christmas trees. It will not survive in areas subject to prolonged cold. However, there are a few specimens growing outdoors in the subtropical gardens of Tresco Abbey Gardens on the Isles of Scilly, in the United Kingdom. What is probably the most northerly specimen growing outdoors is a young tree on Valentia Island on the southwest coast of Ireland. The tendency for potted saplings to develop a barren appearance can be helped by growing them in clumps. In northern climates they can be left outdoors during summer or placed under grow lights to promote fuller growth.

Large numbers of Norfolk Island pines are produced in South Florida for the houseplant industry. The bulk of these are shipped to grocery stores, discount retailers and garden centres during November. Many of these are sprayed with a light coating of green paint prior to sale to increase their eye appeal, although this may weaken or even kill the plant if it cannot photosynthesize adequately.

When planted outside, the trees should be provided with adequate space, as they can grow to a large size.

Araucaria heterophylla has gained the Royal Horticultural Society’s Award of Garden Merit.

Conservation and weediness
The species survival is not threatened at all by the houseplant trade, as it is grown commercially for potted plants. However, the native, natural stands of A. heterophylla were always restricted and have been much reduced since Capt. Cook's time.  Farming, poor land management and the introduction of invasive species have reduced its population on the original three islands considerably. The main remaining stands are now within Norfolk Island National park and are therefore under some shelter. The IUCN classifies the species as vulnerable. Seedlings of this species are starting to turn up under native coastal forest in the North Island of New Zealand, adding this species to the already numerous species of "Wilding Pines" that are a huge issue in that country.

Gallery

References

External links

 Gymnosperm Database: Araucaria heterophylla

heterophylla
Flora of Norfolk Island
Pinales of Australia
Vulnerable flora of Australia
Species endangered by invasive species
Species endangered by agriculture